Three Rivers is a rural locality in the Shire of Cloncurry, Queensland, Australia. In the  Three Rivers had a population of 27 people.

Geography 
There are three towns within Three Rivers:
 Dobbyn
 Kajabbi
 Mount Cuthbert

History

In the  Three Rivers had a population of 27 people.

Heritage listings 
Three Rivers has a number of heritage-listed sites, including:
 Mount Cuthbert Township and Smelter

References

 
Shire of Cloncurry
Localities in Queensland